"Everything Counts" is a 1983 song by the English electronic band Depeche Mode from the album Construction Time Again. A live version of the song was released in 1989 to support the band's live album 101.

Background and themes
The single introduced a transition in lyrical content for the group. "Everything Counts" specifically addresses the issue of corporate greed and corruption in Britain, as the chorus sings of "grabbing hands" that "grab all they can".  Perhaps surprisingly, the single was released at a time when the band itself was not under a formal contract with Mute Records (Gore publishes his songs under the name "Grabbing Hands Music").  In addition to "found" sounds used as samples, the single also samples a variety of musical instruments, such as the xylophone and a melodica (which Gore has been known to play on stage for the song).

It was also the first song in the band's catalogue which includes both of the band's singers prominently (at different times). Lead singer Dave Gahan sings the lead vocals on the verses, while main songwriter Martin Gore sings the lead vocals on the chorus with backing from Alan Wilder. When the song has been performed live, the chorus has been sung by all of the band's members except Gahan, as it appeared in the video for the single. Many live versions of the song also feature Alan Wilder singing countermelody to Dave Gahan during the second verse (repeating the word "The Graph" after each line).

Live performances and re-release

The song would quickly catch on as a fan favourite at the band's concerts and was used as the opening song for the Construction Time Again tour. The first live version of the song to appear on a commercial release came from the Some Great Reward tour in 1984 when a recording from a show in Liverpool appeared on the double A-sided "Blasphemous Rumours/Somebody" single.  During the Music for the Masses Tour, the band used "Everything Counts" as the final encore and in 1989, the song would be re-released as a single in live form, to promote the live album 101.  All live tracks from the release were recorded on 18 June 1988 at the Pasadena Rose Bowl during the final performance of the aforementioned Music for the Masses Tour.  This version of the song is famous for the recording of the crowd continuing to sing the chorus long after the music had stopped.

It also appears in Devotional as the closer. It was played during the first two legs of Touring the Angel in the first encore, and also appears on the Touring the Angel: Live in Milan-DVD.

Everything Counts was also remixed and re-released in 2006. The "Oliver Huntemann & Stephan Bodzin Dub" is featured on the limited edition release of the single Martyr. An unreleased Oliver Huntemann & Stephan Bodzin remix contains more vocal parts from the original version.

Music videos
The music video for "Everything Counts" was directed by Clive Richardson in West Berlin.  The band returned to Richardson after not being satisfied with the work of Julien Temple for the A Broken Frame singles.  Richardson had previously directed the video for "Just Can't Get Enough" two years earlier.  According to Alan Wilder, "It was felt that after the Julien Temple years, we needed to harden up not only our sound but also our image. Clive had lots of new ideas which didn't involve stupid storyboards where we were required to act." In the original music video, the marimba, the melodica, and the shawm are played by Alan Wilder, Martin Gore, and Andy Fletcher, respectively. The shawm, however, is produced by a synthesizer on the studio recording, but the band used the real shawm in the music video and television performances, for show. In this video, frontman Dave Gahan for the first time appeared blonde-haired, losing his natural black colour of hair.

The "Everything Counts (Live)" video was directed by D.A. Pennebaker. The video not only includes portions of the live performance, but also contains various references to the money made from merchandise and ticket sales at the concert, humorously connected to the song's theme of corruption and greed.

B-side
The original release's B-side "Work Hard" is notable in that it is the first Depeche Mode song (excluding instrumentals) that is credited to both Martin Gore and Alan Wilder (the only other case of this is 1986's "Black Day", an alternate version of "Black Celebration," credited to Gore, Wilder, and Daniel Miller).

The B-side of the live re-release is a live recording of "Nothing", a track from Music for the Masses.  The 12" release also includes live recordings of "Sacred" and "A Question of Lust".

Song versions

Remixes
On the original release, there was only one remix available.  The 12" version of the single is called "Everything Counts (In Larger Amounts)", although sometimes (such as on the US release of Construction Time Again) it is referred to simply as the "Long Version".

The live re-release of the single, however, contains a plethora of mixes, from a variety of remixers, despite the fact that the standard 7" and 12" versions contained no remixes.  This release is first Depeche Mode single to be released in a 10" vinyl format; the A-side of the 10" inch version is the "Absolut Mix", remixed by Alan Moulder (certain versions refer to this mix as the "Alan Moulder Mix").  The B-side included the original release's 12" version as well as the "Reprise", a 55-second reprisal of the song's chorus originally placed following the final track ("And Then...") on the Construction Time Again album.  Specifically, it is the ending of "Everything Counts (In Larger Amounts)" with the beat removed.

The limited edition 12" version is the "Bomb the Bass Mix", remixed by Tim Simenon and Mark Saunders.  Simenon would eventually be used by the band as a producer, for the 1997 album Ultra.

B-side remixes
A variety of mixes of other songs would appear on these single releases as well.  On the 1983 release, the 12" B-side contains an extended version of "Work Hard" titled the "East End Remix".

Two remixes of "Nothing" appear on the 1989 release as well, including the "Remix Edit" (sometimes referred to as the "US 7" Mix" as it was the 7" B-side to the US-only single "Strangelove '88") and the "Zip Hop Mix" by Justin Strauss.

A remix of "Strangelove" also appeared on the B-side of the limited edition 12" vinyl, referred to as the "Highjack Mix" by Tim Simenon and Mark Saunders, who also mixed the A-side.

Track listing

1983 release

7": Mute / 7Bong3 (UK) & Sire / 7-29482 (US)
 "Everything Counts" (3:58)
 "Work Hard" (4:21)

12": Mute / 12Bong3 (UK) & Sire / 0-20165 (US)
 "Everything Counts [In Larger Amounts]" (7:18)
 "Work Hard [East End Remix]" (6:57)

12": Mute / L12Bong3 (UK)
 "Everything Counts" [7" Version] (3:58)
 "New Life [Live]" (4:12)
 "Boys Say Go! [Live]" (2:36)
 "Nothing to Fear [Live]" (4:28)
 "The Meaning of Love [Live]" (3:14)

CD (1991 Box Set): Mute / CDBong3 (UK)
 "Everything Counts" (3:58)
 "Work Hard" (4:21)
 "Everything Counts [In Larger Amounts/12“ Version]" (7:18)
 "Work Hard [East End Remix]" (6:57)

Notes and personnel
Depeche Mode in 1983 was: Dave Gahan, Martin Gore, Andy Fletcher, and Alan Wilder.
"Everything Counts", "Nothing to Fear", and "The Meaning of Love" written by Martin Gore.
"Work Hard" written by Martin Gore and Alan Wilder.
"New Life" and "Boys Say Go!" written by Vince Clarke.
Tracks recorded at The Garden Studios, London.
"Everything Counts" mixed at Hansa Mischraum, Berlin.
Gareth Jones was the tonmeister.
Live tracks recorded 25 October 1982 at Hammersmith Odeon in London.

1989 live release

7": Mute / Bong16 (UK)
 "Everything Counts" (Live Full Version) (6:45)
 "Nothing" (Live) (4:35)

12"/CD: Mute / 12Bong16 / CDBong16 (UK)
 "Everything Counts" (Live Single Version) (5:46)
 "Nothing" (Live) (4:40)
 "Sacred" (Live) (5:12)
 "A Question of Lust" (Live) (4:12)

10": Mute / 10Bong16 (UK)
 "Everything Counts (Absolut Mix)" (6:04)
 "Everything Counts (In Larger Amounts)" (7:18)
 "Nothing" (US 7" Mix) (3:57)
 "Everything Counts (Reprise)" (0:55)
Track 3 is usually known as "Nothing (Remix Edit)" in the US.

Limited 12"/CD: Mute / L12Bong16 / LCDBong16 (UK)
 "Everything Counts (Remixed by Tim Simenon & Mark Saunders)" (5:32)
 "Nothing (Remixed by Justin Strauss)" (7:01)
 "Strangelove (Remixed by Tim Simenon & Mark Saunders)" (6:33)
These remixes do not have any titles on the UK releases, but are often knownas "Bomb the Bass Mix", "Zip Hop Mix" and "Highjack Mix", respectively.

CD (2004 Box Set): Mute / CDBong16X (UK)
 "Everything Counts (Live Single Version)" (5:46)
 "Nothing (Live)" (4:35)
 "Sacred (Live)" (5:12)
 "A Question of Lust (Live)" (4:12)
 "Everything Counts (Tim Simenon/Mark Saunders Remix)" (5:32)
 "Nothing (Justin Strauss Remix)" (7:01)
 "Strangelove (Tim Simenon/Mark Saunders Remix)" (6:33)
 "Everything Counts (Absolut Mix)" (6:04)
 "Everything Counts (12" Version)   (7:21)
 "Nothing" (US 7" Mix) (3:57)
 "Everything Counts (Reprise)" (0:55)

7": Sire / 7-22993 (US)
 "Everything Counts (Live Radio Edit)" (4:50)
 "Nothing (Live)" (4:35)

12": Sire / 0-21183 (US)
 "Everything Counts (Tim Simenon/Mark Saunders Remix)" (5:32)
 "Everything Counts (Live Single Version)" (5:45)
 "Nothing (Live)" (4:35)
 "Everything Counts (Absolut Mix)" (6:04)
 "Sacred (Live)" (5:12)
 "A Question of Lust (Live)" (4:12)

Cassette: Sire / 4-22993 (US)
 "Everything Counts (Live Radio Edit)" (4:50)
 "Nothing (Live)" (4:35)

Notes and personnel
Depeche Mode in 1989 was: Dave Gahan, Martin Gore, Andy Fletcher, and Alan Wilder.
All songs written by Martin Gore.
Live tracks recorded at the Pasadena Rose Bowl on 18 June 1988.
Tim Simenon and Mark Saunders' remix of "Everything Counts" (The "Bomb the Bass Mix") was remixed at Konk Studio, London.
Justin Strauss' remixes of "Nothing" (The "Zip Hop Mix" and "Remix Edit") were remixed at Soundtracks Studio, New York City.
Tim Simenon and Mark Saunders' remix of "Strangelove" (The "Highjack Mix") was remixed at Livingston Studios, London.
"Everything Counts (Absolut Mix)" was remixed at Trident Studio, London by Alan Moulder.

Charts

Weekly charts

Year-end charts

Appearances 
The 2007 single Escape to the Stars by German glam-rock band Cinema Bizarre sampled "Everything Counts".

In 2011, the song was covered by DMK, a band featuring Colombian artist Dicken Schrader and his children Milah and Korben, playing toys and common utensils as musical instruments. The YouTube video went viral in 2012 and it currently has more hits than Depeche Mode's original remastered video.

The song is featured on the Grand Theft Auto: Vice City Stories soundtrack. It is played on the video game's radio The Wave 103.

References

External links
Single information from the official Depeche Mode web site: "Everything Counts"
Single information from the official Depeche Mode web site: "Everything Counts (Live)"
Depeche Mode Visual Discography: "Everything Counts"
Depeche Mode Visual Discography: "Everything Counts (Live)"
official Depeche Mode web site: "Everything Counts" lyrics
official Depeche Mode web site: "Work Hard" lyrics

1983 singles
1989 singles
Depeche Mode songs
Political songs
Songs written by Martin Gore
Song recordings produced by Daniel Miller
Song recordings produced by Gareth Jones
Live singles
Mute Records singles
1983 songs
UK Independent Singles Chart number-one singles